Hibbertia cistoidea is a species of flowering plant in the family Dilleniaceae and is endemic to eastern Australia. It is an erect shrub with hairy foliage, linear to narrow lance-shaped leaves, and yellow flowers arranged on the ends of short side shoots, with six to twelve stamens arranged on one side of the carpels.

Description
There are six to twelve stamens in a group on one side of the two hairy carpels. Flowering occurs from spring to autumn.

Taxonomy
This species was first described in 1848 by William Jackson Hooker who gave it the name Pleurandra cistoidea in Thomas Mitchell's Journal of an Expedition into the Interior of Tropical Australia. In 1946, Cyril Tenison White changed the name to Hibbertia cistoidea in Proceedings of the Royal Society of Queensland. The specific epithet (cistoidea) means Cistus-like.

Distribution
This uncommon hibbertia occurs in Queensland and as far south as the South West Slopes in New South Wales.

See also
List of Hibbertia species

References

cistoidea
Flora of Queensland
Flora of New South Wales
Plants described in 1848
Taxa named by William Jackson Hooker